Abdelkrim Oudni (born August 11, 1982, in Algiers) is an Algerian football player. He currently plays for WA Boufarik in the Algerian Ligue 2.

International career
On April 4, 2008, Oudni was called up to the Algeria A' national football team for a 2009 African Championship of Nations qualifier against Morocco. Oudni started the game and played the full 90 minutes as Algeria drew 1-1.

References

External links
 DZFoot Profile
 
 USM-Alger.com Profile

1982 births
Living people
Footballers from Algiers
Algerian footballers
NA Hussein Dey players
Algerian Ligue Professionnelle 1 players
JSM Béjaïa players
MC Saïda players
USM Alger players
CA Bordj Bou Arréridj players
Algeria A' international footballers
Algerian Ligue 2 players
Association football midfielders
WA Boufarik players
21st-century Algerian people